Buková hora TV Tower (Czech: Vysílač Buková hora) is the tallest free-standing transmission tower in Czech Republic (some chimneys and some guyed masts in Czech Republic are taller). It is a 223 metres tall concrete tower situated on Buková hora in North Bohemia and is the facility of the transmitter North Bohemia.

Buková hora TV Tower, which is not accessible for tourists, was built in 1967. Previous TV tower, which was built there between 1960 and 1962, had to be demolished few years later, because of fire inside that. It was originally 181.5 metres tall.

External links
 http://skyscraperpage.com/diagrams/?b58690

See also
 List of towers
 List of tallest structures in the Czech Republic

Towers in the Czech Republic